Azaña may refer to:

People
 Jeremías Azaña (born 2000), Argentinian squash player
 Manuel Azaña (1880–1940), Spanish politician
 Mariano Azaña (1896–1965), Spanish film actor

Places
 Azaña or Numancia de la Sagra, Spain